Rottal-Inn is a Landkreis (district) in the southeastern part of Bavaria, Germany. Neighboring districts are (from the south clockwise) Altötting, Mühldorf, Landshut, Dingolfing-Landau and Passau. To the southeast is the Austrian state Upper Austria (Braunau).

Geography
The main rivers in the district are the Inn and its tributary, the Rott.

History
The district was created in 1972 by merging the two previous districts Pfarrkirchen and Eggenfelden and parts of the districts Griesbach and Vilsbiburg.

Coat of arms
The coat of arms combines the symbols of the two previous districts. Dexter in chief is a panther as the symbol of Eggenfelden, derived from the coat of arms of the Counts of Spanheim, who ruled the area until the 13th century. Sinister in base a horse as the symbol of Pfarrkirchen, as the area is famous for the horse-breeding tradition. The bendlet sinister Azure between them symbolizes the two rivers in the district, the Inn and the Rott.

Towns and municipalities

References

External links

 Official website (German)
 Big architectural photos of old churches in the district

 
Districts of Bavaria